Archduchess Maria Anna of Austria may refer to:

See also
Anna of Austria (disambiguation)
Maria Anna (disambiguation)
Archduchess Maria of Austria (disambiguation)